Isaiah Firebrace (born 21 November 1999) is an Australian singer who won the eighth season of The X Factor Australia in 2016. He then represented Australia in the Eurovision Song Contest 2017 with the song "Don't Come Easy", where he finished 9th.

Early life 
One of twelve children, Firebrace was born in Portland, Victoria, and raised in Moama, New South Wales. He is an Aboriginal Australian; his father is Yorta Yorta and his mother Gunditjmara. Firebrace first came to public attention when he entered the Fast Track Singing Competition in Melbourne. This led to a scholarship at the David Jaanz School of Singing.

Career

2016: The X Factor and debut album 

Isaiah auditioned for the eighth season of The X Factor Australia, singing a cover of Adele's "Hello". Making it through to Bootcamp, he performed a cover of Alicia Keys' "If I Ain't Got You". From the live shows, he advanced to the Grand Final.

On 21 November 2016, at the Grand Final, Isaiah performed Avicii's "Wake Me Up" with Jessica Mauboy, and his winner's single "It's Gotta Be You", winning the contest. His winner's single peaked at number 26 on the Australian Singles Chart. The song also charted in Denmark, Netherlands, New Zealand, and Sweden.

On 9 December 2016, Isaiah released his debut studio album Isaiah. The album peaked at number 12 on the Australian Albums Chart.

2017–present: Eurovision Song Contest and subsequent projects 

Following his X-Factor win, Firebrace reported that he was interested in representing Australia in the Eurovision Song Contest, and put his name forward for possible participation in the 2017 contest. On 7 March 2017, broadcaster SBS announced that they had internally selected Firebrace to represent Australia at the Eurovision Song Contest 2017 in Kyiv, Ukraine. His entry, "Don't Come Easy", was written by DNA Songs, who also composed Dami Im's entry "Sound of Silence".

On 9 May 2017, he qualified from the first semi-final and competed in the final on 13 May, finishing in 9th place.

Throughout 2019, Firebrace completed a 55-date 'Spirit and Beyond' tour through central and regional Australia, where he made it a priority to speak with as many Aboriginal school children as possible to pass on powerful messages about working hard to achieve goals and the importance of finding a passion.

In 2019, Firebrace sang the Australian National Anthem at the TAB Million Dollar Chase greyhound race at Wentworth Park.

In July 2020, Firebrace released "Know Me Better". He said "This song actually means a lot to me because I finally feel like I'm starting to know myself better and I am heading in the direction I want to with my music. I've been in the studio a lot over the last three years and have experimented with lots of styles but 'Know Me Better' is a song that I'm really proud to release. I love the song, I love the production and I just can't wait to be able to show people this song". Firebrace also announced that he was writing a children's book, "The Purple Platypus", which pushes a positive message for kids who feel different.

In August 2020, Firebrace was revealed to be competing as the "Wizard" on the second season of The Masked Singer Australia. He was the sixth contestant eliminated, placing 7th overall.

In 2022, Firebrace participated in Eurovision - Australia Decides for a chance to represent his country in the 2022 contest. He duetted with singer Evie Irie with the song "When I'm With You", ultimately finishing in 10th place.

In September 2022, Firebrace released "Come Together" with Lee Kernaghan and Mitch Tambo. The song coincides with Firebrace's new children's book, also called "Come Together", and scheduled for release on 16 November 2022.

In November 2022, Firebrace released the self-composed Christmas song "First Christmas".

Discography

Studio albums

Singles

As lead artist

As featured artist

Notes

Non-single album appearances

Awards and nominations

Country Music Awards of Australia
The Country Music Awards of Australia is an annual awards night held in January during the Tamworth Country Music Festival. Celebrating recording excellence in the Australian country music industry. They commenced in 1973.
 

! 
|-
|rowspan="2"| 2023 ||rowspan="2"| "Come Together" (with Lee Kernaghan and Mitch Tambo) || Vocal Collaboration of the Year ||  ||rowspan="2"|  
|-
| Heritage Song of the Year || 
|-

References

External links 

 
 

1999 births
21st-century Australian singers
21st-century Australian male singers
Eurovision Song Contest entrants for Australia
Eurovision Song Contest entrants of 2017
Living people
Indigenous Australian musicians
Sony Music Australia artists
The X Factor (Australian TV series) contestants
The X Factor winners
Yorta Yorta people